Kayırlı is a belde (town) in Niğde Province, Turkey. It is situated in the mountainous area around Mount Hasan. It corresponds with the ancient settlement of Andabilis. The population of the town is 1497  as of 2011.

References 

Villages in Niğde Province
Niğde Central District